Kilcogy, is a small village and townland in the civil parish of Drumlumman in south-western County Cavan, Ireland. Kilcogy is located on the R394 road.

People
 John Wilson, former Tánaiste, lived here.

Sport
Mullahoran GAA club is located in the area and takes its players from the town and surrounding areas.

See also
 List of towns and villages in Ireland

External links
 Kilcogy Development Plan 2008 - 2016

References

Towns and villages in County Cavan
Townlands of County Cavan